Consort Zhao may refer to:

 Lady Gouyi (113–88 BC), or Consort Zhao of Emperor Wu of Han
 Zhao Hede (died 7 BC), Consort Zhao of Emperor Cheng of Han
 Zhao Feiyan (died 1 BC), empress of Emperor Cheng of Han
 Consort Dowager Zhao (fl. 10th century), a concubine of Emperor Liu Yan of Southern Han